Bloom Township is one of the thirteen townships of Fairfield County, Ohio, United States. As of the 2010 census the population was 8,466, up from 6,374 at the 2000 census. 7,028 people lived in the unincorporated portions of the township in 2010.

Geography
Located in the western part of the county, it borders the following townships:
 Violet Township - north
 Liberty Township - northeast corner
 Greenfield Township - east
 Hocking Township - southeast corner
 Amanda Township - south
 Walnut Township, Pickaway County - southwest corner
 Madison Township, Pickaway County - west
 Madison Township, Franklin County - northwest

Portions of three villages are located in Bloom Township: a part of Carroll in the northeast, and most of Lithopolis plus a small portion of Canal Winchester in the northwest.

Name and history
Statewide, other Bloom Townships are located in Morgan, Scioto, Seneca, and Wood counties.

Bloom Township was established in 1805. It is the location of the Old Maid's Orchard Mound, a burial mound constructed by the Adena culture; it lies within Chestnut Ridge Metro Park, in the northern part of the township.

Government
The township is governed by a three-member board of trustees, who are elected in November of odd-numbered years to a four-year term beginning on the following January 1. Two are elected in the year after the presidential election and one is elected in the year before it. There is also an elected township fiscal officer, who serves a four-year term beginning on April 1 of the year after the election, which is held in November of the year before the presidential election. Vacancies in the fiscal officership or on the board of trustees are filled by the remaining trustees.

References

External links
 Bloom Township official website
 Fairfield County website

Townships in Fairfield County, Ohio
Year of establishment missing
Townships in Ohio